Bornetella is a genus of green algae in the family Dasycladaceae.

The genus name of Bornetella is in honour of Jean-Baptiste Édouard Bornet (1828–1911), was a French botanist and the genus was published in  Compt. Rend. Hebd. Seances Acad. Sci. Vol.85 on page 815 in 1877.

Species
The World Register of Marine Species includes the following species in the genus:-

Bornetella capitata (Harvey ex E.P.Wright) J.Agardh, 1887
Bornetella clavellina Tanaka, 1956
Bornetella nitida Munier-Chalmas ex Sonder, 1880
Bornetella oligospora Solms-Laubach, 1892
Bornetella sphaerica (Zanardini) Solms-Laubach, 1892
Bornetella vitileviana H.Kasahara, 1998

References

External links

Ulvophyceae genera
Dasycladaceae